Majit Gafuri (20 July 188028 October 1934) was a Bashkir and Tatar poet, writer, and playwright. He was one of the leaders of the democratic trend in Tatar literature and one of the founders of national children's literature.

Biography
Gufari was born to a Tatar-speaking teacher family, in the village of Zilim-Karanovo (now Gafuriysky District, Bashkortostan). At an early age, he showed an aptitude for teaching and in 1893 his father arranged for him to study at a madrasa in a neighboring village. During his spare time, Gafuri worked in Zakir Ramiev's gold mines and taught Kazakh children on the steppe. In 1905, he studied at the famous Kazan Möxämmädiä madrasa and then, in 1906, at the Ğäliä madrasa in Ufa. He remained in Ufa after finishing his studies in 1908.

He wrote his first poem in Tatar, "" (I am a Student), in 1902, which was followed in 1904 by his first book,  (The Siberian Railway, or the State of the Nation), was published in Orenburg.

Following the First Russian Revolution in 1905, questions of social classes, national identity, and resistance to oppression began to rise in his work. He also was engaged in studying folklore and traditions; in 1910, he published a translation of the Bashkir epic Zayatulak and Hyuhylu. After the death of Ğabdulla Tuqay in 1913, Gafuri took up the mantel of a leading democratic voice in Tatar literature.

1917 Russian Revolution, Gafuri wrote poetry and plays celebrating workers and the struggle against tsardom during the Russian Civil War. He also worked to organize local newspapers for Bashkortostan. He also wrote fables for children based upon Kazakh folklore.

 in his monograph The Literary Heritage of the Bashkir People noted "... Gafuri is a monolingual writer: He wrote in the Tatar language, but at the same time he served two peoples — the Tatars and the Bashkirs."

Personal life
Gafuri married Zöhrä Nasıyrova (1892–1938), the daughter of tailors from Kilem, Buzdyaksky District. They had two sons.

Legacy
In 1940, the Krasnousolsky District of the Bashkir ASSR was renamed Gafuriysky District in Gafuri's honor. In 1948, the  opened in the house in Ufa where Gafuri lived from 1924 to 1934. It was one of the first literary museums in Bashkortostan. In 1961,  was established in the Oktyabrsky district of Ufa. In 1971, the Bashkir Academic Drama Theater was renamed in Gafuri's honor and a monument to him was added in 1978. Across Russia, some 200 streets bear Gafuri's name.

References 

1880 births
1934 deaths
Tatar dramatists and playwrights
20th-century dramatists and playwrights
Tatar people from the Russian Empire
Tatar people of the Soviet Union
Tatar poets
Soviet writers